The 2007 Canberra Raiders season was the 26th in the club's history. They competed in the NRL's 2007 Telstra Premiership, finishing the regular season 14th (out of 16).

Pre-season
The Raiders' first trial match was against a highly understrength Brisbane Broncos team, with the top side in England playing their World Club Challenge match as premiers. However, the Raiders lost this game, resulting in widespread criticism and the team's entrenchment as wooden spoon favourites. Despite bouncing back against Wests Tigers in their second match, the Raiders were unable to put paid to these predictions, largely due to the side's lack of experience at both first grade and representative level.

Regular season
The Raiders' first NRL match of the season started inauspiciously, with a 32–6 loss to the Manly Sea Eagles. Their first win was in the third round, a convincing 48–18 win over the Newcastle Knights. The team registered consecutive wins for the only time in Round 11 against the Dragons, and entered the top 8 for the first time in Round 13. However, this win was followed by four straight losses, and the Raiders were unable to find any consistency before the season finished.

This season was notable for the Raiders' struggles away from home – just two of their nine wins occurred away from Canberra Stadium.

Results

Ladder

Club Awards

Squad

 Colin Best
 Matt Bickerstaff
 Todd Carney
 Marshall Chalk
 Neville Costigan
 Michael Dobson
 Andrew Dunemann
 Phil Graham
 Bronx Goodwin
 David Howell
 Steve Irwin (released mid-season)
 Ben Jones
 Brett Kelly
 Tom Learoyd-Lahrs
 Scott Logan
 Josh Miller
 David Milne
 Adrian Purtell
 Nigel Plum (signed mid-season)
 Willie Raston
 Alan Rothery
 Troy Thompson
 Trevor Thurling
 Dane Tilse
 Alan Tongue
 Glen Turner
 Michael Weyman
 Jason Williams
 William Zillman
 Lincoln Withers

References

Canberra Raiders seasons
Canberra Raiders season